George Francis Huston (1812 – 18 December 1890) was an Australian politician.

Huston was born in 1812. He was a doctor before entering politics. In 1887 he was elected to the Tasmanian House of Assembly, representing the seat of New Norfolk. He served until his death in 1890.

References

1812 births
1890 deaths
Members of the Tasmanian House of Assembly